Planta is the fourth studio album by Brazilian indie rock band CSS. It was released on June 11, 2013. The album was produced by David Sitek. It is the band's first album recorded without guitarist Adriano Cintra, who left the band in November 2011.

Critical reception
Planta was met with "mixed or average" reviews from critics. At Metacritic, which assigns a weighted average rating out of 100 to reviews from mainstream publications, this release received an average score of 54 based on 18 reviews.

In a review for AllMusic, critic reviewer Matt Collar wrote: "Planta is a frothy, lightly experimental electro-pop outing that retains all of the band's fun, dance party energy. Planta features all of the old-school-sounding synths and drum machines CSS have built their sound around since their infectious 2006 debut, Cansei de Ser Sexy." Greg Inglis of DIY said: "Planta is the sound of a band rejuvenated, a diverse yet cohesive effort that tightens the sonic screws without losing any of the warmth and identity they've managed to create for themselves."

Track listing

Personnel

Band members
 Lovefoxxx – vocals
 Ana Rezende – guitar, keyboard
 Luiza Sá – drums
 Carolina Parra – guitar, drums

Additional musicians
 Jaleel Bunton – drums
 Todd Simon – horn

Production
 Dave Sitek – producer
 Steve Fallone – mastering

Charts

References

CSS (band) albums
2013 albums